The 1995 NCAA Division II women's basketball tournament was the 14th annual tournament hosted by the NCAA to determine the national champion of Division II women's  collegiate basketball in the United States.

Two-time defending  champions North Dakota State defeated Portland State in the championship game, 98–85, to claim the Bison's fourth NCAA Division II national title. This was North Dakota State's fourth title in five years and would go on to be the third of four consecutive titles for the Bison.

The championship rounds were contested in Fargo, North Dakota.

Regionals

East - Erie, Pennsylvania
Location: Mercyhurst Athletic Center Host: Mercyhurst College

Great Lakes - Houghton, Michigan
Location: Student Development Complex Gymnasium Host: Michigan Technological University

North Central - Fargo, North Dakota
Location: Bison Sports Arena Host: North Dakota State University

Northeast - North Easton, Massachusetts
Location: Merkert Gymnasium Host: Stonehill College

South - Lakeland, Florida
Location: Jenkins Field House Host: Florida Southern College

South Atlantic - Norfolk, Virginia
Location: Joseph G. Echols Memorial Hall Host: Norfolk State University

South Central - St. Joseph, Missouri
Location: MWSC Fieldhouse Host: Missouri Western State College

West - Portland, Oregon
Location: PSU Gym Host: Portland State University

Elite Eight - Fargo, North Dakota
Location: Bison Sports Arena Host: North Dakota State University

All-tournament team
 Kasey Morlock, North Dakota State
 Amy Towne, Missouri Western State
 Michelle Doonan, Stonehill
 Kim Manifesto, Portland State
 Lori Roufs, North Dakota State
 Kristi Smith, Portland State

See also
 1995 NCAA Division II men's basketball tournament
 1995 NCAA Division I women's basketball tournament
 1995 NCAA Division III women's basketball tournament
 1995 NAIA Division I women's basketball tournament
 1995 NAIA Division II women's basketball tournament

References
 1995 NCAA Division II women's basketball tournament jonfmorse.com

 
NCAA Division II women's basketball tournament
1995 in North Dakota